André Rouyer (20 June 1929 – 28 January 1994) was a French film actor. He appeared in 60 films between 1956 and 1994.

Selected filmography

 Pardonnez nos offenses (1956)
 Rapt au deuxième bureau (1958)
 Le concerto de la peur (1963) - Rif, le complice de Valdo
 Angélique, Marquise des Anges (1964) - Clément Tonnel
 The Vampire of Düsseldorf (1965)
 La tête du client (1965) - Le gardien de prison (uncredited)
 La Métamorphose des cloportes (1965) - Un client du cabaret (uncredited)
 Et la femme créa l'amour (1966) - Un joueur de poker (uncredited)
 Tender Scoundrel (1966) -  Un turfiste (uncredited)
 Is Paris Burning? (1966) - (uncredited)
 Un idiot à Paris (1967) - Un étudiant (uncredited)
 Mise à sac (1967) - Rotenbach
 The Heist (1970)
 La Horse (1970) -Un voisin
 Last Leap (1970) - Salvade
 Point de chute (1970)
 L'amour, oui! Mais... (1970) - L'avocat
 Distracted (1970) - L'habitant de Sarcelles (uncredited)
 Le Chat (1971) - Le délégué
 Le Saut de l'ange (1971) - Rigaux, un officier de police
 The Widow Couderc (1971) - Policeman
 Chronique d'un couple (1971)
 Caméléons (1971) - Pierre
 Coup pour coup (1972)
 Un cave (1972)
 Justine de Saden (1972) - Antonin
 Hearth Fires (1972) - L'orateur lors de la manifestation
 L'humeur vagabonde (1972) - Cazal
 Plot (1972)
 Zahltag (1973)
 Décembre (1973) - L'aumônier
 Le complot (1973)
 Fantastic Planet (1973) - (voice)
 R.A.S. (1973)
 Défense de savoir (1973)
 Two Men in Town (1973) - Le capitaine des C.R.S. (uncredited)
 The Train (1973) - Le mécanicien de la locomotive
 Die Ameisen kommen (1974) - Lino
 The Phantom of Liberty (1974) - Le brigadier
 Le mâle du siècle (1975) - Le commissaire
 Le futur aux trousses (1975)
 Maîtresse (1975) - Mario
 I Am Pierre Riviere (1976) - Le président du tribunal
 Violette & François (1977) - Le vigile du premier grand magasin
 La question (1977) - Capitaine Lavisse
 The Accuser (1977) - Rumin, le délégué syndical
 Le beaujolais nouveau est arrivé (1978)
 Le Mors aux dents (1979) - Le patron du tabac '16e'
 Tout dépend des filles... (1980) - Le patron bord de mer
 La bande du Rex (1980) - L'inspecteur Robert
 La gueule du loup (1981) - Un inspecteur
 Le démon dans l'île (1983) - Georges Cotier - le propriétaire du supermarché
 Le thé à la menthe (1984) - L'agent de police (Place de la Concorde)
 Le transfuge (1985)
 Le voyage à Paimpol (1985) - Le père de Maryvonne
 La maison assassinée (1988) - Didon Pujol

References

External links

1929 births
1994 deaths
People from Argentan
French male film actors
20th-century French male actors